The 1963–64 season was the 72nd season in Liverpool F.C.'s existence and their second season back in the Football League's First Division. Liverpool won its first championship title since 1946-47, thanks to a spectacular performance in its only second season in the top flight. Manager Bill Shankly was hailed for the success, which meant the Scot had turned Liverpool from an average team in the Second Division to league champions in a little more than four years. Roger Hunt scored 31 league goals, while partner Ian St John managed 21 and Alf Arrowsmith 15, the trio being vital for the side that scored a club record 92 goals in the First Division.

Squad

Goalkeepers
  Tommy Lawrence
  Jim Furnell

Defenders
  Gerry Byrne
  Phil Ferns
  Chris Lawler
  Ronnie Moran
  Tommy Smith
  Bobby Thomson
  Ron Yeats

Midfielders
  Alan A'Court
  Ian Callaghan
  Kevin Lewis
  Jimmy Melia
  Gordon Milne
  Willie Stevenson
  Gordon Wallace
  Johnny Wheeler
  Peter Thompson

Attackers
  Alf Arrowsmith
  Phil Chisnall
  Bobby Graham
  Roger Hunt
  John Sealey
  Ian St John

League table

Results

First Division

FA Cup

References
 LFC History.net – 1963-64 season
 Liverweb - 1963-64 Season

Liverpool F.C. seasons
Liverpool
English football championship-winning seasons